María Teresa Dova is an Argentine physicist. She is a senior researcher at National Scientific and Technical Research Council in Argentina and professor in the Physics Department of the Faculty of Exact Sciences at the National University of La Plata.

Biography 
Dova was raised in Alberti, Buenos Aires. She studied physics at the National University of La Plata, where she obtained her PhD in 1988 with the thesis "Phase transitions in highly coordinated fluorinated Hf and Zr compounds".

In 1989, she was awarded a postdoctoral fellowship to study at the L3 experiment led by Samuel Chao Chung Ting at the European Organisation for Nuclear Research (CERN) where she began her career in experimental high-energy physics investigating the physics of the tau lepton and the characteristics of neutral and charged weak interaction.

In 1996, she participated in the creation of the Pierre Auger Observatory designed to study high-energy cosmic rays, promoting the participation of the National University of La Plata in the experiment. She contributed relevant studies of the propagation of ultra-high energy cosmic rays (UHECR) in the intergalactic medium and the composition of cosmic rays. In 2001, she was elected Chair of the Collaboration Board, composed of representatives of 49 institutions from the 17 participating countries, and was re-elected until 2006.

In 2005, she led the joint Argentinean effort for the country's first participation in a European Organisation for Nuclear Research (CERN) experiment, the ATLAS Experiment. This is one of the two multi-proposite detectors of the LHC accelerator, designed to search for the Higgs Boson and study its properties, precision measurements of the Standard Model and the search for new particles and interactions.

References 

Year of birth missing (living people)
Living people
Academic staff of the National University of La Plata
National University of La Plata alumni
Argentine women physicists
21st-century Argentine physicists
20th-century Argentine physicists
People from Buenos Aires Province